Azecoidea is a superfamily of small and very small air-breathing land snails, terrestrial gastropod mollusks in the infraorder Pupilloidei .

Families
 Azecidae H. Watson, 1920

References

External links
  Saadi, A. J.; Mordan, P. B.; Wade, C. M. (2021). Molecular phylogeny of the Orthurethra (Panpulmonata: Stylommatophora). Zoological Journal of the Linnean Society

Helicina (suborder)
Gastropod superfamilies